Motor Fuel Group (styled as mfg, officially Motor Fuel Limited) is the largest independent operator of petrol stations in the United Kingdom with 911 sites. The company is based in St Albans and owned outright by Clayton, Dubilier & Rice.

History

The company formed via a series of mergers of smaller operators. Malthurst acquired 75 sites branded Q8 from Kuwait Petroleum Corporation in 2004. Malthurst and Refined Holdings (which used the Pace brand) merged into MRH. MFG acquired MRH with its 500 sites in 2018.

Brands and services
Most MFG sites all use third party brands, namely BP, Shell, Esso, Texaco, JET and Murco.

MFG has also opened electric vehicle charging forecourts at its Putney and Stretford sites.

Finances
In 2020 MFG company had revenue of £3,308 million with an operating profit of £249 million.

In June 2021 MFG's fungible add-on was set at £65 million with a margin of SONIA+CAS+475 bit/s and a 99.75 OID.

References

Filling stations in the United Kingdom
Retail companies of the United Kingdom